This is a list of Fordham baseball seasons. The Fordham Rams baseball team represents Fordham University and is a member of the Atlantic 10 Conference of the NCAA Division I. The team played its first game in 1859.  No team was fielded in 1944 due to World War II.

The Rams are college baseball's winningest program, with 4,500 victories through the 2022 season.  They have appeared in 8 NCAA Regionals and district playoffs and played in the second ever college baseball game, and the first to use the Knickerbocker Rules which evolved into modern baseball.

Season Results

Notes

References

Fordham
Fordham Rams baseball seasons